In chemistry, the molar mass of a chemical compound is defined as the ratio between the mass and the amount of substance (measured in moles) of any sample of said compound. The molar mass is a bulk, not molecular, property of a substance. The molar mass is an average of many instances of the compound, which often vary in mass due to the presence of isotopes. Most commonly, the molar mass is computed from the standard atomic weights and is thus a terrestrial average and a function of the relative abundance of the isotopes of the constituent atoms on Earth. The molar mass is appropriate for converting between the mass of a substance and the amount of a substance for bulk quantities.
 
The molecular mass and formula mass are commonly used as a synonym of molar mass, particularly for molecular compounds; however, the most authoritative sources define it differently. The difference is that molecular mass is the mass of one specific particle or molecule, while the molar mass is an average over many particles or molecules.
 
The formula weight is a synonym of molar mass that is frequently used for non-molecular compounds, such as ionic salts.
 
The molar mass is an intensive property of the substance, that does not depend on the size of the sample. In the International System of Units (SI), the coherent unit of molar mass is kg/mol. However, for historical reasons, molar masses are almost always expressed in g/mol.
 
The mole was defined in such a way that the molar mass of a compound, in g/mol, is numerically equal to the average mass of one molecule, in daltons. It was exactly equal before the redefinition of the mole in 2019, and is now only approximately equal, but the difference is negligible for all practical purposes. Thus, for example, the average mass of a molecule of water is about 18.0153 daltons, and the molar mass of water is about 18.0153 g/mol.
 
For chemical elements without isolated molecules, such as carbon and metals, the molar mass is computed dividing by the number of moles of atoms instead. Thus, for example, the molar mass of iron is about 55.845 g/mol.
 
Since 1971, SI defined the "amount of substance" as a separate dimension of measurement. Until 2019, the mole was defined as the amount of substance that has as many constituent particles as there are atoms in 12 grams of carbon-12. During that period, the molar mass of carbon-12 was thus exactly 12 g/mol, by definition. Since 2019, a mole of any substance has been redefined in the SI as the amount of that substance containing an exactly defined number of particles, . The molar mass of a compound in g/mol thus is equal to the mass of this number of molecules of the compound in grams.

Molar masses of elements 

The molar mass of atoms of an element is given by the relative atomic mass of the element multiplied by the molar mass constant,  For normal samples from earth with typical isotope composition, the atomic weight can be approximated by the standard atomic weight or the conventional atomic weight.

Multiplying by the molar mass constant ensures that the calculation is dimensionally correct: standard relative atomic masses are dimensionless quantities (i.e., pure numbers) whereas molar masses have units (in this case, grams per mole).

Some elements are usually encountered as molecules, e.g. hydrogen, sulfur, chlorine. The molar mass of molecules of these elements is the molar mass of the atoms multiplied by the number of atoms in each molecule:

Molar masses of compounds 
The molar mass of a compound is given by the sum of the relative atomic mass  of the atoms which form the compound multiplied by the molar mass constant :

Here,  is the relative molar mass, also called formula weight. For normal samples from earth with typical isotope composition, the standard atomic weight or the conventional atomic weight can be used as an approximation of the relative atomic mass of the sample. Examples are:

An average molar mass may be defined for mixtures of compounds. This is particularly important in polymer science, where different polymer molecules may contain different numbers of monomer units (non-uniform polymers).

Average molar mass of mixtures 

The average molar mass of mixtures  can be calculated from the mole fractions  of the components and their molar masses :

It can also be calculated from the mass fractions  of the components:

As an example, the average molar mass of dry air is 28.97 g/mol.

Related quantities 

Molar mass is closely related to the relative molar mass of a compound, to the older term formula weight (F.W.), and to the standard atomic masses of its constituent elements. However, it should be distinguished from the molecular mass (which is confusingly also sometimes known as molecular weight), which is the mass of one molecule (of any single isotopic composition) and is not directly related to the atomic mass, the mass of one atom (of any single isotope). The dalton, symbol Da, is also sometimes used as a unit of molar mass, especially in biochemistry, with the definition 1 Da = 1 g/mol, despite the fact that it is strictly a unit of mass (1 Da = 1 u = , as of 2018 CODATA recommended values).

Gram atomic mass is another term for the mass, in grams, of one mole of atoms of that element. "Gram atom" is a former term for a mole.

Molecular weight (M.W.) is an older term for what is now more correctly called the relative molar mass. This is a dimensionless quantity (i.e., a pure number, without units) equal to the molar mass divided by the molar mass constant.

Molecular mass 

The molecular mass is the mass of a given molecule: it is usually measured in daltons (Da or u). Different molecules of the same compound may have different molecular masses because they contain different isotopes of an element. This is distinct but related to the molar mass, which is a measure of the average molecular mass of all the molecules in a sample and is usually the more appropriate measure when dealing with macroscopic (weigh-able) quantities of a substance.

Molecular masses are calculated from the atomic masses of each nuclide, while molar masses are calculated from the standard atomic weights of each element. The standard atomic weight takes into account the isotopic distribution of the element in a given sample (usually assumed to be "normal").

The distinction between molar mass and molecular mass is important because relative molecular masses can be measured directly by mass spectrometry, often to a precision of a few parts per million. This is accurate enough to directly determine the chemical formula of a molecule.

DNA synthesis usage 
The term formula weight has a specific meaning when used in the context of DNA synthesis: whereas an individual phosphoramidite nucleobase to be added to a DNA polymer has protecting groups and has its molecular weight quoted including these groups, the amount of molecular weight that is ultimately added by this nucleobase to a DNA polymer is referred to as the nucleobase's formula weight (i.e., the molecular weight of this nucleobase within the DNA polymer, minus protecting groups).

Precision and uncertainties 
The precision to which a molar mass is known depends on the precision of the atomic masses from which it was calculated, and value of the molar mass constant. Most atomic masses are known to a precision of at least one part in ten-thousand, often much better (the atomic mass of lithium is a notable, and serious, exception). This is adequate for almost all normal uses in chemistry: it is more precise than most chemical analyses, and exceeds the purity of most laboratory reagents.

The precision of atomic masses, and hence of molar masses, is limited by the knowledge of the isotopic distribution of the element. If a more accurate value of the molar mass is required, it is necessary to determine the isotopic distribution of the sample in question, which may be different from the standard distribution used to calculate the standard atomic mass. The isotopic distributions of the different elements in a sample are not necessarily independent of one another: for example, a sample which has been distilled will be enriched in the lighter isotopes of all the elements present. This complicates the calculation of the standard uncertainty in the molar mass.

A useful convention for normal laboratory work is to quote molar masses to two decimal places for all calculations. This is more accurate than is usually required, but avoids rounding errors during calculations. When the molar mass is greater than 1000 g/mol, it is rarely appropriate to use more than one decimal place. These conventions are followed in most tabulated values of molar masses.

Measurement 
Molar masses are almost never measured directly. They may be calculated from standard atomic masses, and are often listed in chemical catalogues and on safety data sheets (SDS). Molar masses typically vary between:
1–238 g/mol for atoms of naturally occurring elements;
 for simple chemical compounds;
 for polymers, proteins, DNA fragments, etc.

While molar masses are almost always, in practice, calculated from atomic weights, they can also be measured in certain cases. Such measurements are much less precise than modern mass spectrometric measurements of atomic weights and molecular masses, and are of mostly historical interest. All of the procedures rely on colligative properties, and any dissociation of the compound must be taken into account.

Vapour density 

The measurement of molar mass by vapour density relies on the principle, first enunciated by Amedeo Avogadro, that equal volumes of gases under identical conditions contain equal numbers of particles. This principle is included in the ideal gas equation:

where  is the amount of substance. The vapour density is given by

Combining these two equations gives an expression for the molar mass in terms of the vapour density for conditions of known pressure and temperature:

Freezing-point depression 

The freezing point of a solution is lower than that of the pure solvent, and the freezing-point depression is directly proportional to the amount concentration for dilute solutions. When the composition is expressed as a molality, the proportionality constant is known as the cryoscopic constant and is characteristic for each solvent. If  represents the mass fraction of the solute in solution, and assuming no dissociation of the solute, the molar mass is given by

Boiling-point elevation 

The boiling point of a solution of an involatile solute is higher than that of the pure solvent, and the boiling-point elevation is directly proportional to the amount concentration for dilute solutions. When the composition is expressed as a molality, the proportionality constant is known as the ebullioscopic constant and is characteristic for each solvent. If  represents the mass fraction of the solute in solution, and assuming no dissociation of the solute, the molar mass is given by

See also 

 Mole map (chemistry)

References

External links
 HTML5 Molar Mass Calculator  web and mobile application.
 Online Molar Mass Calculator with the uncertainty of M and all the calculations shown
 Molar Mass Calculator Online Molar Mass and Elemental Composition Calculator
 Stoichiometry Add-In for Microsoft Excel  for calculation of molecular weights, reaction coefficients and stoichiometry. It includes both average atomic weights and isotopic weights.
 Molar mass: chemistry second-level course.

Mass